Devorah Bertonov ( – April 19, 2010) was an Israeli pioneer of dance and stage arts.

Biography
Devorah Bertonov was the daughter of Yehoshua Bertonov, one of the founders of Habima Theatre in Moscow, who also won the Israel Prize. She was born in the Russian Empire. Her family immigrated to the area of the Ottoman Empire that would become Mandatory Palestine in 1915 and settled in Tel Aviv. She studied dance in Berlin from 1929 until 1932.

Awards and recognition
Bertonov was awarded the Israel Prize in 1991. Making Way for a Green Leaf is a documentary about Bertonov filmed when she was 85.

See also
Dance of Israel
List of Israel Prize winners

References

Israel Prize women recipients
Israeli female dancers
1910s births
2010 deaths
People from Tel Aviv
Israel Prize in dancing recipients
Israeli people of Georgian-Jewish descent
Emigrants from the Russian Empire to the Ottoman Empire